Ray Eugene Duke (May 9, 1923 – November 11, 1951) was a soldier in the United States Army during the Korean War. He posthumously received the Medal of Honor for his actions on April 26, 1951. He was captured by the enemy, and died as a prisoner of war later that year.

Medal of Honor citation
Rank and organization: Sergeant First Class, U.S. Army, Company C, 21st Infantry Regiment, 24th Infantry Division

Place and date: Near Mugok, Korea, April 26, 1951

Entered service at: Whitwell (Marion County), Tenn. Born: May 9, 1923, Whitwell, Tenn.

G.O. No.: 20, March 19, 1954

Citation:

Sfc. Duke, a member of Company C, distinguished himself by conspicuous gallantry and outstanding courage above and beyond the call of duty in action against the enemy. Upon learning that several of his men were isolated and heavily engaged in an area yielded by his platoon when ordered to withdraw, he led a small force in a daring assault which recovered the position and the beleaguered men. Another enemy attack in strength resulted in numerous casualties but Sfc. Duke, although wounded by mortar fragments, calmly moved along his platoon line to coordinate fields of fire and to urge his men to hold firm in the bitter encounter. Wounded a second time he received first aid and returned to his position. When the enemy again attacked shortly after dawn, despite his wounds, Sfc. Duke repeatedly braved withering fire to insure maximum defense of each position. Threatened with annihilation and with mounting casualties, the platoon was again ordered to withdraw when Sfc. Duke was wounded a third time in both legs and was unable to walk. Realizing that he was impeding the progress of 2 comrades who were carrying him from the hill, he urged them to leave him and seek safety. He was last seen pouring devastating fire into the ranks of the onrushing assailants. The consummate courage, superb leadership, and heroic actions of Sfc. Duke, displayed during intensive action against overwhelming odds, reflect the highest credit upon himself, the infantry, and the U.S. Army.

See also

List of Medal of Honor recipients
List of Korean War Medal of Honor recipients

Notes

References

External links

1923 births
1951 deaths
United States Army Medal of Honor recipients
American military personnel killed in the Korean War
Korean War recipients of the Medal of Honor
People from Whitwell, Tennessee
United States Army personnel of the Korean War
United States Army soldiers
American prisoners of war in the Korean War